Kaladougou is a commune in the Cercle of Dioïla in the Koulikoro Region of south-western Mali. The principal town lies at Dioïla. In 1998 the commune had a population of 22,949.

See also
 List of cities in Mali

References

Communes of Koulikoro Region